Helen Louise Miles (born 2 March 1967) is a Welsh former sprinter who competed mainly in the 100 metres. She represented Great Britain at the 1988 Olympic Games in Seoul. In 1985, she won a European Junior bronze medal in the 100 metres.

Career
Miles was born in Bridgend, Wales. She first came to prominence at the 1985 European Junior Championships in Cottbus, where she won two bronze medals, in the 100 metres, running 11.63 secs and the 4 × 100 m relay.

In 1986, she represented Wales at the Commonwealth Games in Edinburgh, winning a bronze medal in the sprint relay, her teammates were Sian Lewis, Sallyanne Short and Carmen Smart.

In 1988, Miles earned Olympic selection in the 100 metres. In Seoul, she was eliminated in the heats running 11.88, after sustaining an injury.

Achievements
5 Times Welsh 100 metres Champion (1984,88,90,91,93)
3 Times Welsh 200 metres Champion (1984,91,93)

References

External links

Living people
1967 births
Sportspeople from Bridgend
Welsh female sprinters
Olympic athletes of Great Britain
Athletes (track and field) at the 1988 Summer Olympics
Athletes (track and field) at the 1986 Commonwealth Games
Commonwealth Games bronze medallists for Wales
Commonwealth Games medallists in athletics
Olympic female sprinters
Medallists at the 1986 Commonwealth Games